"The Idiot Boy" is a lyrical poem by William Wordsworth.

Poem
The poem is of 463 lines and is written in five-line stanzas with a varying rhyme scheme. It was first published in the Lyrical Ballads of 1798, where it appeared between The Mad Mother and Lines Written Near Richmond.

The poem is narrative in form. Set in the countryside, it tells the story of Betty Foy and Johnny, the disabled son she loves. Foy's neighbour Susan is sick; Foy has no choice but to send her son into the nearby village to fetch the doctor. She places him on her pony and sends him on his way. When Johnny has not returned after several hours, she grows worried and sets off to find him. The doctor has not seen the boy; finally, she finds him placidly astride his pony, who is grazing near a stream. As they are walking home, they encounter Susan, who has, as it were, worried herself well and come in search of her friend.

Theme and style
In the preface to the 1800 Lyrical Ballads, Wordsworth remarks that the purpose of this poem, as of The Mad Mother, is to trace "the maternal passion through many of its more subtle windings." It is, then, one of the volume's poems concerned with mothers, and Betty Foy, in her love and care, may be considered a natural foil to the bad mothers of The Mad Mother and The Thorn. The poem is also a clear demonstration of the principles Wordsworth laid out in his prefaces; it is a poem illustrating common emotions in a rural setting, using plain language and eschewing the formality of most eighteenth-century verse.

Wordsworth is concerned mainly with psychological experimentations, using speakers who are very much like himself.  These speakers do not connect with the characters portrayed in the poems beyond the simple stereotypes that the narrators provide as characterisation. The impotence of the poet-narrator in the presentation of the poem prevents him from harnessing the creative power that Wordsworth identified as a "spontaneous overflow" of joy within a man of genius: the poet. In "The Idiot Boy," both the mother Betty and her son, Johnny, whom prejudice and ignorance have labelled an idiot, achieve the spontaneous overflow that characterises a successful creation, but the poet cannot, and repeatedly laments his inability to describe in poetic form what the story contains. This poem, like many in Lyrical Ballads, concerns itself with the psychological insight of the mother, showing her clear concern for the child she values. As the dramatic yet ordinary tale unfolds, the reader is invited to question the title of the poem and society's prejudicial designation of the boy, which so contrasts with his mother's insight.

Betty Foy
Betty Foy is a character appearing in William Wordsworth's poem and is the mother of the title character. In the poem, Betty is caring for a sick neighbour; in desperation, she sends her mentally handicapped son Johnny on horseback to fetch a doctor from the nearby town. When he has not returned after several hours, she grows frantic and sets out to find him. Eventually, she discovers him near a waterfall, his pony feeding. She leads him home and on the way they are met by the sick neighbour, who has, as it were, worried herself back to wellness and found the strength to help look for the boy.

In popular culture
Rivendell Bicycle Works has a bicycle model, Betty Foy, named for the mother in the poem. The bicycle is a mixte with a headbadge that features Betty Foy's portrait.

References

External links
 The Idiot Boy at Bartleby.com.
 

1798 poems
Poetry by William Wordsworth